Yumnam Joykumar Singh  is an Indian politician and member of the National People's Party. He served as a 2nd and former deputy chief minister of Manipur from 2017 to 2022. He belongs to the National People's Party. 
Before entering politics he was Director-General of Police of Manipur. He was 1976 cadre IPS officer who was DGP of Manipur from 16 March 2007 till 5 January 2012.

In 2017, he became Deputy Chief Minister of Manipur in the N. Biren Singh led cabinet.

References

People from Imphal
National People's Party (India) politicians
Living people
1955 births
Indian police chiefs
Manipur MLAs 2017–2022
Deputy Chief Ministers of Manipur
People from Imphal West district
Bharatiya Janata Party politicians from Manipur